The 1922 Ice Hockey European Championship was the seventh edition of the ice hockey tournament for European countries associated to the International Ice Hockey Federation.  
 
The tournament was played between February 14, and February 16, 1922, in St. Moritz, Switzerland, and it was won by Czechoslovakia.

Results

February 14

February 15

February 16

Final standings

Top Goalscorer

Jaroslav Jirkovský (Czechoslovakia), 6 goals

References
 Euro Championship 1922

1922
Ice Hockey European Championships
Euro
February 1922 sports events
Sport in St. Moritz